Belgrave is the self-titled debut studio EP by Canadian artistic pop band Belgrave, released in May 2011.

Background
The EP is a compilation of songs originally found on Belgrave's unreleased demo.  The songs were written between 2009-2010 and submitted to producer Joseph Donovan.  Donovan spent nearly six months dedicating much of his time perfecting Belgrave's sound.  Subsequently, the EP's launch date had been delayed twice.  February 11 at Montreal's La Sala Rossa and May 4 at O Patro Vys were original launch dates until the band and Donovan finally settled on May 27.
The Montreal Gazette's review of Belgrave was positive. While CHOM 97.7 has featured the track Tokyo multiple times, many music blogs raved about the track Six Minutes.

Track listing

Personnel

Belgrave (music and arrangement):
Trevor Boucher
Liam Boucher
Catherine Cere
Michael Bufo
Jonathan Powter

Other personnel:
Pietro Amato – French horn (tracks 4 & 6)
Joseph Donovan - Sounds (tracks 1 & 2)
 Emilie Marzinotto - Background vocals (track 6)

Technical personnel
Joseph Donovan – recording
Joseph Donovan – mixing
Joseph Donovan and Adrian Popovich - engineering
Rose Anne Darwent – artwork design
Christopher Snow - Photography

References

2011 albums